Autostrada A55, also called tangenziale di Torino, is a motorway that runs in the suburbs of Turin. In its main route, which surrounds the subalpine city for three quarters, it is composed of three lanes by direction of travel with an emergency lane and is divided figuratively into two sections: the North ring road and the South ring road, both managed by the ATIVA.

References

Buildings and structures completed in 1976
1976 establishments in Italy
Autostrade in Italy
Transport in Piedmont
Ring roads in Italy